On Target is the fifth studio album by British rock band Fastway, and their first album without original frontman Dave King.

Track listing

Personnel
Fastway
Eddie Clarke – guitars, backing vocals
Lea Hart – lead vocals and guitars

Additional musicians
Don Airey, Paul Airey - keyboards
Neil Murray - bass
 Tim 'Nibbs' Carter - bass, backing vocals
Terry Thomas - bass synths, backing vocals, arrangements with Fastway
Gary Ferguson - drums
Christopher O'Shaughnessy - backing vocals, pre-production, arrangements with Fastway
Tim Cutting, Bram Tchaikovsky - backing vocals
Christine Byford - female vocals on "She Is Danger"

Production
Matt Kemp - engineer
Vernon Austin - mixing

References

Fastway (band) albums
1988 albums
Enigma Records albums